Wayne Gordon Hammond (born February 11, 1953 in Cleveland, Ohio) is an American scholar known for his research and writings on the works of J. R. R. Tolkien.

Biography 

Wayne Hammond was born in Cleveland, Ohio and then raised in Brooklyn, Ohio. He earned a Bachelor of Arts degree with Honors as an English major at Baldwin-Wallace College in 1975. He gained his Master of Arts degree in Library Science from the University of Michigan in 1976. From August 1976 to June 2015 he was Assistant Librarian of the Chapin Library of Rare Books at Williams College, and in July 2015 was promoted to Chapin Librarian.

In 1994 Hammond married fellow Tolkien scholar Christina Scull and the two have since collaborated on several projects. John Garth describes Hammond and Scull as "two highly regarded veterans of Tolkien studies."

Their book J. R. R. Tolkien: Artist and Illustrator: won the 1996 Mythopoeic Scholarship Award for Inklings Studies, one of five such awards that Hammond has won.

Books 

 1982 The Graphic Art of C.B. Falls: An Introduction.
 1993 J. R. R. Tolkien: A Descriptive Bibliography – with the assistance of Douglas A. Anderson
 1995 (with Wayne G. Hammond) J. R. R. Tolkien: Artist and Illustrator. Houghton Mifflin.
 2000 Arthur Ransome: A Bibliography.
 2005 (with Christina Scull) The Lord of the Rings: A Reader's Companion. Houghton Mifflin.
 2006 (with Christina Scull) The Lord of the Rings 1954-2004: Scholarship in Honor of Richard E. Blackwelder. Marquette University Press.
 2006 (with Christina Scull) The J. R. R. Tolkien Companion and Guide. Houghton Mifflin. Revised and expanded edition 2017.

See also 

 Tolkien research
 Middle-earth

References

External links 
Official site of Wayne Hammond and Christina Scull
Interview with Wayne Hammond and Christina Scull, 2007 
Interview with Wayne Hammond and Christina Scull, 2011 
 

1953 births
Living people
People from Cleveland
American writers
Baldwin Wallace University alumni
University of Michigan School of Information alumni
Williams College faculty
Tolkien Society members
Tolkien studies